Konstanze von Gutzeit (born 8 October 1985) is a German cellist.

Life 
Gutzeit was born in Bochum. She received further instruction from Wolfgang Sellner, the solo cellist of the Bochumer Symphoniker, and Professor Wilfried Tachezi in Linz. 

In 1998, she began her studies at the University of Music and Performing Arts Vienna with Heinrich Schiff. Gutzeit plays an original instrument by Gioffredo Cappa from 1677, which was made available to her by the Schulte-Uentrop Foundation.

Gutzeit made her debut as a soloist with the Pro Musica Orchestra Salzburg at the age of 12. Since then, she has performed with numerous renowned orchestras, including the Orchestre Philharmonique de Monte Carlo, the Bochum Symphony Orchestra, the Northwest German Philharmonic, the Vienna Chamber Orchestra, the Brandenburgisches Staatsorchester Frankfurt (Oder), the Bruckner Orchestra Linz, the Stuttgart Chamber Orchestra and the  led by conductors such as Kurt Masur, Marek Janowski, Michael Hofstetter, Toshiyuki Kamioka, Heribert Beissel and Ingo Ingensand.

Prizes 
Since 1991, she has participated many times in the Jugend musiziert competitions and won first prizes in both the violoncello and chamber music categories at the national competition, most recently with the highest score in the solo competition in 2004. 

At the age of 16, she was the youngest participant in the Austrian competition for young musicians "Gradus ad Parnassum" in 2001, winning 1st prize and also the so-called "Grand Prize" in all categories

References

External links 
 
 

German women classical cellists
1985 births
Living people
People from Bochum